Amy Ndiaye is a Senegalese politician who is a member of the National Assembly from the ruling Benno Bokk Yakaar coalition.

Attack 
On 1 December 2022, a pregnant Ndiaye was involved in a fight with two fellow MPs in the chamber while it was in session, being kicked and slapped. Mamadou Niang and Massata Samb were sentenced to six months in prison and ordered to pay Ndiaye five million CFA franc in compensation.

References 

Living people
Year of birth missing (living people)
Place of birth missing (living people)
Members of the National Assembly (Senegal)
21st-century Senegalese politicians
21st-century Senegalese women politicians